
Year 73 BC was a year of the pre-Julian Roman calendar. At the time it was known as the Year of the Consulship of Lucullus and Longinus (or, less frequently, year 681 Ab urbe condita). The denomination 73 BC for this year has been used since the early medieval period, when the Anno Domini calendar era became the prevalent method in Europe for naming years.

Events
<onlyinclude>

By place

Roman Republic 
 Third Servile War: Spartacus, a Thracian gladiator, escapes with around 70 slave-gladiators from a gladiator school at Capua. They defeat a small Roman force and equip themselves with captured military equipment as well with gladiatorial weapons. Spartacus and his band of gladiators plunder the region surrounding Capua and retire to a defensible position on Mount Vesuvius.
 Battle of Mount Vesuvius: Spartacus defeats a Roman militia force (3,000 men) under Gaius Claudius Glaber. The rebel slaves spend the winter of 73–72 BC training, arming and equipping their new recruits, as well as expanding their raiding territory, which includes the towns of Nola, Nuceria, Thurii and Metapontum.

Births 
 Herod the Great, client king of Judea (d. 4 BC)
 Marcus Porcius Cato, assassin of Julius Caesar (d. 42 BC)

Deaths 
 Devabhuti, king of the Shunga Empire
 Gaius Aurelius Cotta, Roman statesman and orator
 Heli, king of Britain (approximate date)

References